Ionel Schein (1927 – 30 December 2004) was a Romanian-born French architect.

Schein was a pioneer in the use of synthetic materials and created the first plastic house in 1956. On his death Le Monde described him as "one of the major figures in French architecture".

Further reading
 Silvia Berselli, "Ionel Schein : Dall'habitat evolutivo all'architecture populaire", Mendrisio Academy Press 2015, .

References

1927 births
2004 deaths
20th-century French architects
French urban planners
Romanian emigrants to France